George Cromarty (September 15, 1941 – February 12, 1992) was an American folk guitarist and singer. He is best known as the co-writer, with Ed Rush, of the song "Plastic Jesus", though he went on to record three albums of solo guitar music in the 1970s and 1980s. The Folk Music Sourcebook likened his playing style to John Fahey's, and George Winston cites Cromarty as a musical influence. His music has been featured on the soundtracks of many films, including the Coen brothers' Inside Llewyn Davis. The "Columbia record exec" in Inside Llewyn Davis was named "Mr. Cromarty" in honor of Cromarty.

Biography
Cromarty met Ed Rush while both were students in Fresno, California. They first performed together at Kalisa's restaurant in Monterey, California as The Goldcoast Singers. They moved to San Francisco, and after performing in clubs there, they were invited to perform before an audience of 1,000 at the San Francisco State Folk Festival. The audience responded enthusiastically, and the duo played five encores, closing with "Plastic Jesus". The recording of this performance was released in 1962 as Here They Are! The Goldcoast Singers.

In 1963, Cromarty was drafted into the army. He later settled in Morro Bay, California. His first solo album of acoustic guitar music, Grassroots Guitar, was released in 1973 on his own label, Thistle Records. His next release, The Only One, was ostensibly an album of songs for children. Cromarty's third and final album, Wind in the Heather, was recorded for George Winston's Dancing Cat Records in 1984.

Cromarty died on February 12, 1992. He was 50 years old.

Awards
In 2014, Cromarty was co-nominated for a Golden Globe Award for Best Original Song for "Please Mr. Kennedy," from Inside Llewyn Davis. His co-nominees were Ed Rush, T Bone Burnett, Justin Timberlake, and Joel and Ethan Coen.

Discography
 Here They Are! The Goldcoast Singers, with Ed Rush (World Pacific Records, 1962)
 Grassroots Guitar (Thistle Records, 1973)
 The Only One: Music for People Who Are Still Growing (Thistle Records, 1973)
 Wind in the Heather (Dancing Cat Records, 1984)

References

1992 deaths
1941 births
American folk musicians
20th-century American musicians
People from Morro Bay, California